Alexander Michaletos (born November 25, 1992) is a South African former child actor.

Michaeletos (also credited as Michaletos) made his film and acting debut in the 2005 film Duma, directed by Carroll Ballard. He stars as Xan, a twelve-year-old boy who has to let a cheetah called Duma go and acts with Eamonn Walker, Campbell Scott and Hope Davis.

External links
 
 "Duma" Official Website
 "The Farm Inn" where Alexander lives

South African male child actors
Living people
1992 births
People from Johannesburg
South African male film actors